TAV Airports Holding is a Turkish airport operation and services firm that is part of Groupe ADP. It is one of the world's largest airport operators, providing services to 1 million flights and 152 million passengers in 2018.

TAV was established as a joint venture between Tepe Construction, Akfen, and Airport Consulting Vienna in 1997. Today, it is the leading airport operator in Turkey and also provides duty free, food and beverage, ground handling, IT and security services.

History 

In October 2011, TAV Airports was put for sale for €2 billion, with Credit Suisse handling the bid process. On March 12, 2012, TAV announced the planned sale of 38% of the firm's issued share capital to the group Aéroports de Paris for a total consideration of US$874 million. The sale value was determined based on the 32% premium of the company's latest closing price. The two companies provide service for 180 million passengers at 37 airports in total. Board Member and President & CEO Sani Sener continued in his position.

In January 2015, TAV Airports won the bid on the $1.1 billion project to increase Bahrain International Airport's capacity from 4 to 14 million, with a 51-month engagement to build it. In October 2015, TAV Airports won a 20-year lease of the Milas–Bodrum Airport with the bid price of €717 million. In the US, TAV made an entry by winning the bid for the duty-free areas of the George Bush Intercontinental Airport.

In January 2016, Sani Sener, CEO of TAV Airports Holding, announced its intention to penetrate the Iranian market. As of August 2016, TAV Airports was in negotiation with the Cuban government to create a consortium along with the French company Bouygues for the expansion and management of La Havana's José Martí International Airport. The deal would also include the development of the San Antonio de los Baños Airfield.

Activities 

In addition to operating 15 airports, TAV is involved in duty-free sales, food and beverage services, ground handling services, information technologies, security, and operation services.

In 2010, 55% of the firm's consolidated revenues were non-aviational. It generated 753 million Euro consolidated revenues. The company's shares have been listed on the Istanbul Stock Exchange since February 23, 2007, under the "TAVHL" ticker symbol.

Airports operated 
As of May 2020, TAV operates the following airports:

 Zagreb Franjo Tuđman Airport

Batumi International Airport
Tbilisi International Airport

Almaty International Airport

Riga International Airport
 
Ohrid St. Paul the Apostle Airport
Skopje International Airport

Madinah Airport
 
Enfidha–Hammamet International Airport
Monastir Habib Bourguiba International Airport

Ankara Esenboğa Airport
Alanya Gazipaşa Airport
İzmir Adnan Menderes Airport
Istanbul Atatürk Airport (best airport, Air Transport News Awards 2016, 61.8 million passengers in 2015)
Milas–Bodrum Airport

References

External links 
 Official website
 Groupe ADP

Airport operators
Companies listed on the Istanbul Stock Exchange
Transport companies established in 1997
1997 establishments in Turkey
Companies based in Istanbul
Transport operators of Turkey